Buigny-Saint-Maclou is a commune in the Somme department in Hauts-de-France in northern France.

Geography
The Abbeville airport is within the boundaries of the commune.

Population

See also
Communes of the Somme department

References

Communes of Somme (department)